Verell Pennington Ferguson (July 21, 1859 – February 4, 1923) was a Democratic member of the Mississippi House of Representatives for Hinds County from 1912 until his death.

Biography 
Verell Pennington Ferguson was born on July 21, 1859, in Vaiden, Carroll County, Mississippi, to Daniel Echols Ferguson and Caroline (Denman) Ferguson. He was of Scotch ancestry. Verell's occupation was a farmer and a planter. He married Eliza Roberts in 1877. He was first elected to the Mississippi House of Representatives, representing Hinds County, in 1911, and was re-elected in 1915 and 1919. He was a Democrat. He died on February 4, 1923, before the end of his term, in his son's house in Learned, Hinds County, Mississippi.

References 

1859 births
1923 deaths
People from Vaiden, Mississippi
Democratic Party members of the Mississippi House of Representatives